Mikkel Morgenstar Pålssønn "Mix" Diskerud (born October 2, 1990) is a professional soccer player who plays as a midfielder for Cypriot club Omonia. Born in Norway, he represented the United States national team.

His mother coined his nickname "Mix" when he was learning to walk, as he was energetic and ran around the house like a mixmaster.

Club career

Stabæk
Born in Oslo, Norway, to an American mother and Norwegian father, Diskerud started his career in Frigg, and was discovered by Stabæk during a district tournament in Oslo. He joined their junior team in 2005, at the same time attending the sport school Norwegian College of Elite Sport. Starting in the 2006 season, he played regularly for the club's B team in the Norwegian Second Division over the next seasons. In 2008, he also helped the club's junior team win the Norwegian Junior Cup (U-19).

He made his debut for the first team in a 2008 Norwegian Football Cup match against Vestfossen. He was then named in the starting eleven in the 2009 La Manga Cup, scoring after two minutes in his first match. He also played as a substitute in the Super Final, the Norwegian Super Cup, one week before the league opener. He was benched in the opening match, but in the second match against Brann, he was allowed to make his debut in a regular first-team match. He came in as a substitute some ten minutes before full-time and scored the equalizer in the 84th minute; the game ended 1–1.

K.A.A. Gent
Diskerud was loaned to Belgian Pro League club Gent for the latter part of the 2011–12 season.

Rosenborg
In August 2012, Diskerud moved to Tippeligaen club Rosenborg until the end of the 2012. After an aborted move to the Portland Timbers in late 2012 Diskerud signed an extension with Rosenborg.

Diskerud scored Rosenborg's equalizing goal in the final of the Norwegian Football Cup, but it proved to be only a consolation as the club lost 4–2 to Molde.

New York City FC
In January 2015, Diskerud signed with New York City. He scored New York City's first ever MLS goal in an inaugural match draw with Orlando City.

In March 2017, New York City bought out Diskerud's contract, releasing him before the beginning of the 2017 season. He remained an NYCFC player and registered with New York City FC. Shortly after, the U.S. international was rumoured to be close to securing a loan to Swedish side IFK Goteborg which would provide "minor salary relief" for New York City FC although they would still remain responsible for paying the bulk of the player's wages.

As part of ESPN FC's MLS Confidential annual anonymous player poll in 2017 which surveyed over 140 of the league's current players, Diskerud was named as "the most overrated player in the league"—receiving 16% of the overall vote.

Loan to IFK Göteborg
In March 2017, Diskerud signed on loan for IFK Göteborg after failing to cement his place with New York City FC. His loan expired in late August 2017.

Manchester City
In January 2018, Diskerud was announced to have signed a four and a half year contract with Premier League club Manchester City, with a source saying he would be training with the club's EDS.

Return to IFK Göteborg
Shortly after joining Manchester City Diskerud re-signed on loan for Göteborg until the end of the season.

Loan to Ulsan Hyundai
Diskerud was loaned to South Korean side Ulsan Hyundai for a year on July 18, 2018.

Loan to Helsingborg
In June 2020, Swedish Allsvenskan side Helsingborgs IF signed Diskerud on a short-term loan. Before he even played a match for the team he was in trouble after he sent a tweet. It was after the first game of the season, which HIF lost with 0-3 against Varbergs BoIS he tweeted ''Okay, one positive thing is that 3 points were taken by a team from västkusten. Go västkusten''. That was something which the HIF supporters didn't like. He made his debut in 18 June in a away game against Kalmar FF, which ended with a 4–0 loss. Diskerud played 45 minutes in that game.

Denizlispor
On January 20, 2021, Diskerud signed a one and a half year deal with Turkish Süper Lig club Denizlispor.

Omonia
On July 1, 2021, Diskerud signed for Cypriot First Division club Omonia Nicosia. Diskerud was part of the starting line-up when Omonia won the 2021–22 Cypriot Cup, their first since 2012, beating Ethnikos Achna 5-4 on penalties, and guaranteeing a place in the 2022–23 Europa League Play-off round.

International career

Diskerud's mother is from Arizona, originally making him eligible to represent either the United States or Norway. While Diskerud was playing for Norway, United States U-20 coach Thomas Rongen approached him as he was preparing to take a corner, and asked if he had an American passport, to which Diskerud answered, "yes." In April 2008 he played a tournament for the United States under-20s team, recording three assists during a game against Northern Ireland. A month later, he played for the Norwegian under-18's team against the United States. In February 2009, when asked about his future plans for international play, he replied that it does not really matter which country he represents. He used the phrase "first-come, first-served", meaning that he will respond to the first international call-up from either country. In March 2009 he played for the Norwegian under-19's team. He later stated that he would likely accept any future call ups from US Soccer but had not heard from them since the youth tournament in 2008.

Only weeks later, after several strong performances for his Norwegian club, Stabæk, he was contacted by U.S. Soccer about attending an under-20s camp in May 2009. He had to turn down the invitation due to his role in Stabæk and that the camp schedule conflicts with the Norwegian season. However, Diskerud traveled with the U.S. under-20 team to Egypt in June 2009 for one of two friendlies, and he scored his first goal against Egypt. His appearance in the Egyptian friendly signaled his final choice for international play for the United States, saying "I am a Norwegian-American. I would love to play for both countries, but I can't."

Diskerud debuted for the senior team in 2010. He was a member of the squad that won the 2013 Gold Cup. He later was a member of the squad for the 2014 World Cup, although he failed to make an appearance at the tournament.  On September 10, 2013, in Columbus, Ohio, Diskerud assisted on Landon Donovan's goal in a World Cup Qualifier against Mexico.  It was Donovan's last goal for the United States Men's National Team.

Career statistics

Club

International
International goals

Honors
Stabæk
Superfinalen: 2009

 Omonia
Cypriot Cup: 2021–22
Cypriot Super Cup: 2021

United States
CONCACAF Gold Cup: 2013

References

External links

 
 
 

1990 births
Living people
Footballers from Oslo
American soccer players
United States men's under-20 international soccer players
United States men's under-23 international soccer players
United States men's international soccer players
Norwegian footballers
Norway youth international footballers
American people of Norwegian descent
Norwegian people of American descent
Stabæk Fotball players
K.A.A. Gent players
Rosenborg BK players
New York City FC players
IFK Göteborg players
Manchester City F.C. players
Ulsan Hyundai FC players
Denizlispor footballers
Eliteserien players
Belgian Pro League players
Major League Soccer players
Allsvenskan players
K League 1 players
Süper Lig players
Expatriate footballers in Belgium
Expatriate footballers in Turkey
Norwegian expatriate footballers
American expatriate soccer players
2013 CONCACAF Gold Cup players
2014 FIFA World Cup players
2015 CONCACAF Gold Cup players
CONCACAF Gold Cup-winning players
Association football midfielders
Expatriate footballers in Sweden
Expatriate footballers in Cyprus